is a rechargeable contactless smart card ticketing system for public transport in Shizuoka, Japan, introduced by Shizuoka Railway (Shizutetsu) group, from March, 2006. The card is officially called SHIZUTETSU CARD LuLuCa. Just like JR East's Suica or JR West's ICOCA, the card uses RFID technology developed by Sony corporation known as FeliCa. Shizutetsu group also introduced PiTaPa and ICOCA from September 2007 for their lines. Although normal LuLuCa cards (with the exception of LuLuCa+PiTaPa) cannot be used on regular PiTaPa or ICOCA systems, ten of the most popular IC cards in Japan can be used on LuLuCa, as of 2013.

Usable area
Shizutetsu Justline; all the buses in Karase, Oshika, Torisaka, Mariko and Nishikubo.
Shizuoka Railway; Shizuoka Shimizu Line.
Other facilities of Shizutetsu group, including Shinshizuoka-Center and Shizutetsu Store.

Types of cards
LuLuCa POINT: A simple loyalty card of Shizutetsu Stores. Not a smart card.
LuLuCa PASAR+POINT: A smart card for public transport, as well as the above function.
All day adult card
Special discount card: For handicapped customers only.
Child's card: For elementary school students or younger.
Student's card: For junior high school students or older.
LuLuCa+: A credit card for The Shizuoka Bank, as well as the above two functions.
LuLuCa+PiTaPa: The card usable in PiTaPa accepting area, with the above functions.

External links 
  Official website by Shizuoka Railway

Fare collection systems in Japan
Contactless smart cards